Sadettin Dilbilgen was a philatelist who was born in Ottoman Macedonia. He was the childhood friend of Mustafa Kemal Atatürk.

Early life 
Dilbilgen was born to a Macedonian–Turkish family and lived close to the Marko's Monastery located in the village of Markova Sušica. At a young age he moved to France, where he was educated and stayed for 16 years. After the Turkish War of Independence, the majority of his family moved to Izmir, Turkey. In Izmir he worked as a French teacher and then began stamp-collecting during his spare time. He was to become one of Turkey's most important collectors.

Turkish philatelists
People from Studeničani Municipality
Year of birth missing
Year of death missing
Philately of Turkey
Macedonian Turks